Buell is a surname. Notable people with the surname include:

Abel Buell (1742–1822), goldsmith and counterfeiter in the American colonies
Al Buell (1910–1996), American pin-up artist
Alexander H. Buell (1801–1853), New York politician, U.S. congressman
Alice Standish Buell (1892–1960), American artist and printmaker
Augustus Caesar Buell (1847–1904), American author of several plagiarized and fabricated biographies
Bebe Buell (born 1953), American fashion model and singer
Caroline Brown Buell (1843-1927), American writer and temperance and suffrage activist
Charles Buell (1900–1964), American football player and educator
Dai Buell (1892–1939), American pianist and teacher
Don Carlos Buell (1818–1898), Union general during the American Civil War
Dorothy Richardson Buell (1886–1976), American educator and nature preservationist
Erik Buell (born 1950), American motorcycle racer and designer
George P. Buell (1833–1893), American civil engineer and soldier
Hal Buell (born ?), American photojournalist and photo archivist
Jacob Dockstader Buell (1827–1894), Canadian lawyer and politician
Jaxon Buell (2014–2020), American child who outlived expectations with about 20% of a normal brain
Jed Buell (1897–1961), American film producer, director, and screenwriter
Lawrence Buell (born 1939), American literature professor, literary critic, and pioneer in ecocriticism
Lawrence Buell (politician) (born 1934), American politician
Marjorie Henderson Buell (1904–1993; see: Marge (cartoonist)), American cartoonist publishing under the pen name "Marge"
Martin T. Buell (born 1942), American martial arts black belt and instructor
Mary Van Rensselaer Buell (1893–1969), American biochemist, and nutrition and physiological chemistry researcher
Monty Buell (born ?), American history and philosophy professor
Murray Fife Buell (1905–1975), American plant ecologist
Pop Buell (1913–1980), American humanitarian aid worker in Laos
Presendia Huntington Buell (1810–1892; see: List of Joseph Smith's wives)
Robert Buell, several people
Ryan Buell (born 1982), American paranormal investigator
Ryan W. Buell (born ?), American business academic
Samuel W. Buell (born ?), American law professor
Sarah Josepha Hale (also known as Sarah Josepha Buell Hale; 1788–1879), American writer, activist, and editor
Susie Tompkins Buell (born 1943), American businesswoman, entrepreneur, and progressive donor
Temple Hoyne Buell (1895–1990), American architect
William Buell (1751–1832), American born Canadian jurist, miller, and politician
William Buell Jr. (1792–1862), Canadian journalist and politician
William M. Buell (1810–1869), American politician
Willis Buell (also spelled Wyllys; 1790–1851), American politician and judge

Fictional characters:
Judge Buell, character in the Judge Dredd comic strip